Axinactis is a genus of bivalve mollusc in the family Glycymerididae.

Species
 Axinactis delessertii (Reeve, 1843)
 Axinactis inaequalis (G. B. Sowerby I, 1833)

References

Glycymerididae
Bivalve genera